Nakanojo Dam is an arch dam located in Gunma Prefecture in Japan. The dam is used for irrigation and power production. The catchment area of the dam is 143.6 km2. The dam impounds about 11  ha of land when full and can store 1180 thousand cubic meters of water. The construction of the dam was started on 1957 and completed in 1960.

References

Dams in Gunma Prefecture